The Bell 212 (also known as the Twin Two-Twelve) is a two-blade, medium helicopter that first flew in 1968. Originally manufactured by Bell Helicopter in Fort Worth, Texas, United States, production was moved to Mirabel, Quebec, Canada in 1988, along with all Bell commercial helicopter production after that plant opened in 1986.

The 212 was marketed to civilian operators and has up to a 15-seat capacity, with one pilot and fourteen passengers. In cargo-carrying configuration the 212 has an internal capacity of 220 ft3 (6.23 m3). An external load of up to 5,000 lb (2,268 kg) can be carried.

Development

Based on the stretched fuselage Bell 205, the Bell 212 was originally developed for the Canadian Forces as the CUH-1N and later redesignated as the CH-135. The Canadian Forces took delivery of 50 starting in May 1971. At the same time the United States military services ordered 294 Bell 212s under the designation UH-1N.

By 1971, the Bell 212 had been developed for commercial applications. Among the earliest uses of the type in civil aviation was by Helicopter Service AS of Norway to be used in support of offshore drilling; it proved popular across the offshore sector in particular as it had been certified for operating under marginal weather conditions. Today, the 212 can be found used in logging operations, maritime rescue and resupply in the Arctic on the Distant Early Warning Line or North Warning System.

The 212 is powered by a Pratt & Whitney Canada PT6T-3 Twin-Pac made up of two coupled PT6 power turbines driving a common gearbox. They are capable of producing up to 1,800 shp (1,342 kW). Should one power section fail the remaining section can deliver 900 shp (671 kW) for 30 minutes, or 765 shp (571 kW) continuously, enabling the 212 to maintain cruise performance at maximum weight.

Early 212s configured with an Instrument Flight Rules (IFR) package were required to have a large and very obvious fin attached to the roof of the aircraft, above and slightly behind the cockpit. This fin was initially determined necessary to alter the turning performance of the aircraft during complex instrument flight maneuvers, but is no longer required due to revised stipulations of the type certificate. Many aircraft still fly with the modification.

In 1979, with the purchase of eight by the Civil Air Authority, the 212 became the first U.S. helicopter sold in the People's Republic of China.

The ICAO designator for this aircraft as used in a flight plan is "B212". Bell developed the Model 212 further with the Bell 412; the major difference being the composite four-blade main rotor.  The last Bell 212 was delivered in 1998.

Variants
Bell Model 212 - Bell Helicopters company designation for the UH-1N.
Twin Two-Twelve - Civil utility transport version. It can carry up to 14 passengers.
Agusta-Bell AB 212 - Civil or military utility transport version. Built under license in Italy by Agusta.
Agusta-Bell AB.212ASW - Anti-Submarine Warfare variant of AB.212
Bell Model 412 - Bell 212 with a four-bladed semi-rigid rotor system.
Eagle 212 Single - Single engine variant with a Lycoming T53-17 or T53-BCV engine produced by Eagle Copters of Calgary, Alberta, Canada.

Operators

Civil and government operators
The Bell 212 is used by many private and commercial operators, it is particularly popular in the oil industries and for law enforcement use.

 Argentine Army

 Canadian Coast Guard - former operator of six 212s

Croatian Police

 Policía Nacional de Colombia

 Greek Navy

 Air Greenland

Japan Coast Guard

Serbian Police

Slovenian National Police

Royal Thai Police

San Bernardino County Sheriff's Department  
 San Diego Fire Department  
Ventura County Sheriff's Department

Specifications (Bell 212)

See also

References

Further reading 
 Chant, Christopher. Fighting Helicopters of the 20th Century. Graham Beehag Books, Christchurch, Dorset, England (1996). 
 Debay, Yves. Combat Helicopters, France: Histoire & Collections (1996).
 Mutza, Wayne. UH-1 Huey in Colors. Carrollton, TX: Squadron Signal. .

External links

 The Bell 212 on Greg Goebel's Air Vectors

1960s United States helicopters
1960s United States civil utility aircraft
Search and rescue helicopters
1960s Canadian helicopters
Twin-turbine helicopters
Aircraft first flown in 1968
212